Hongtao Yu is a Chinese chemist and academic administrator serving as the provost and senior vice president of student affairs at Morgan State University.

Life 
Yu completed a B.S. at the University of Science and Technology of China in 1982. He earned a M.S. from the University of the Chinese Academy of Sciences in 1986. In 1990, Yu completed a Ph.D. at the Technical University of Munich. He was a postdoctoral fellow in the department of chemistry at the Louisiana State University from 1990 to 1994. Yu was a senior postdoctoral fellow in the department of medicinal chemistry in the college of pharmacy at University of Texas at Austin from 1994 to 1996.

Yu was an assistant professor of chemistry from 1996 to 2001 at the Jackson State University. He became an associate professor in 2001 and professor in 2006. He was chair of the department of chemistry and biochemistry from 2004 to 2016. In 2016, Yu joined Morgan State University as dean and professor of chemistry in the school of computer, mathematical, and natural sciences. In 2021, he became provost and senior vice president for academic affairs.

References 

Living people
Year of birth missing (living people)
Place of birth missing (living people)
University of Science and Technology of China alumni
University of the Chinese Academy of Sciences alumni
Technical University of Munich alumni
Jackson State University faculty
Morgan State University faculty
21st-century Chinese scientists
Chinese chemists
21st-century chemists
People's Republic of China emigrants to the United States